Juan Boldames Ibáñez, O.C.D. (17 August 1574 – September 1634) was a Roman Catholic prelate who served as Bishop of Ispahan (1632–1633) and Auxiliary Bishop of Toledo (1632–1633).

Biography
Juan Boldames Ibáñez was born on 17 August 1574 in Calahorra, Spain and ordained a priest in the Order of the Discalced Carmelites of the Blessed Virgin Mary of Mount Carmel. On 6 September 1632, he was appointed during the papacy of Pope Alexander VII as Bishop of Ispahan and Auxiliary Bishop of Toledo. On 19 September 1632, he was consecrated bishop by Bernardino Spada, Cardinal-Priest of Santo Stefano al Monte Celio. He served as Bishop of Ispahan and Auxiliary Bishop of Toledo until his resignation on 5 September 1633. He died in September 1634.

References

17th-century Roman Catholic bishops in Spain
Bishops appointed by Pope Alexander VII
1574 births
1634 deaths
17th-century Roman Catholic bishops in Safavid Iran